Dorothy Knowles (born 1927) is a Canadian artist.

Dorothy Knowles or Knollys (same pronunciation) may also refer to:

Dorothy Knowles (academic) (1906–2010), British academic
Dorothy Knollys (c.1524–1605), English noblewoman